Bruno Enzo Liuzzi (born 30 August 2000) is an Argentine-Chilean footballer who plays as a midfielder for Chilean side Deportes Antofagasta on loan from Sarmiento de Junín.

Career
A product of both Club Atlético Jorge Newbery and Sarmiento de Junín, Liuzzi has played on loan at Chilean side Unión La Calera in the top division (2021) and Gimnasia y Esgrima de Mendoza in the Argentine second level (2022).

Previously, he took part of Sarmiento squad in the 2020 Primera Nacional, when the club got the league title.

In 2023, after training with Chilean side Deportes Copiapó, even making appearances in friendly matches, he joined Deportes Antofagasta in the Chilean second level.

Personal life
Liuzzi holds dual Argentine-Chilean nationality, since his mother is Chilean.

Honours
Sarmiento
 Primera Nacional: 2020

References

External links
 

2000 births
Living people
Sportspeople from Santa Fe Province
Argentine footballers
Argentine sportspeople of Chilean descent
Argentine expatriate footballers
Citizens of Chile through descent
Chilean footballers
Club Atlético Sarmiento footballers
Unión La Calera footballers
Gimnasia y Esgrima de Mendoza footballers
C.D. Antofagasta footballers
Argentine Primera División players
Chilean Primera División players
Primera Nacional players
Primera B de Chile players
Expatriate footballers in Chile
Argentine expatriate sportspeople in Chile
Association football midfielders